is a Japanese football defender. He has played in Japan, Singapore, Cambodia, Philippines, Montenegro, Latvia, Bosnia and Herzegovina, Mongolia and Malta.

Career
Before beginning his international football career, Tanaka played at Albirex Niigata. However, he lacked opportunities in the home-based club, thus he played during his early career in the satellite clubs such as Japan Soccer College, Albirex Niigata Singapore and  Albirex Niigata Phnom Penh. He made his professional debut playing with the Albirex Niigata Singapore franchise in the 2014 S.League.

In 2015, he played for JP Voltes in the Philippines before moving to Europe at the end of the year signing with FK Iskra Danilovgrad and playing with them the second half of the 2015–16 Montenegrin First League. Next summer, when the season ended, he signed with FK Ogre playing in the Latvian First League. He returned to Balkans in 2017 and played with FK Slavija Sarajevo in the 2017–18 First League of the Republika Srpska, a second-tier team in Bosnia and Herzegovina. His next experience was playing with FC Ulaanbaatar in 2019 Mongolian Premier League.

In January 2020, he returned to Europe, this time by signing with Maltese premier-league team Sliema Wanderers.

References

1993 births
Living people
Japanese footballers
Japanese expatriate footballers
Association football defenders
Japan Soccer College players
Albirex Niigata Singapore FC players
JPV Marikina F.C. players
FK Iskra Danilovgrad players
FK Slavija Sarajevo players
FC Ulaanbaatar players
Sliema Wanderers F.C. players
Singapore Premier League players
Montenegrin First League players
Japanese expatriate sportspeople in Singapore
Japanese expatriate sportspeople in Cambodia
Japanese expatriate sportspeople in the Philippines
Japanese expatriate sportspeople in Montenegro
Japanese expatriate sportspeople in Latvia
Japanese expatriate sportspeople in Mongolia
Japanese expatriate sportspeople in Malta
Expatriate footballers in Singapore
Expatriate footballers in Cambodia
Expatriate footballers in the Philippines
Expatriate footballers in Montenegro
Expatriate footballers in Latvia
Expatriate footballers in Mongolia
Expatriate footballers in Malta
Expatriate footballers in Bosnia and Herzegovina